UAO may refer to:

 FAA LID for Aurora State Airport
 Uppsala Astronomical Observatory, the oldest astronomical observatory in Sweden